Kirill Turichenko, or Kyrylo Turychenko, was born January 13, 1983, in Odessa, Ukraine. He is a Ukrainian musician, singer and actor. Turichenko has been a member of the Russian boys band Ivanushki International since 2013.

Biography

Early life
Kirill Turichenko was born on January 13, 1983,  in Ukraine, Odessa.
In 1989–1997 he studied at high school no. 82, and in 1997–2000 at high school no. 37 drama class in Odessa under the direction of Olga Kashneva.
In 1997 he finished a musical school where he learned to play piano.
In 2004 he finished the South Ukrainian State Pedagogical University named after K.D. Ushynsky, the faculty of music and art.

As a child he was in love with music. From his early years he took part in Odessa show-team "Star Hour", which has participated in many festivals and contests.

Music career

In 1994, Turichenko took part in popular TV contests "Morning star", "Small stars" and "5 + 20". In 1995 as the participant of "Star Hour" he played a leading part in the musical "The Magic Aladdin's Lamp".

Later the art director of show-team Svetlana Vetryak had created a vocal quartet KA2U, in which Turichenko became a soloist. In 1999 this quartet has won the first award of the Second All-Ukrainian Charitable festival Black Sea games. As a result young musicians were able to perform at the Tavria Games festival – a popular music festival of Ukraine.

As a part of KA2U. Turichenko-operated for a long time with the largest and popular concert clubs of Odessa, where public gathers specially for their performances 5 days a week.

After studying in the drama school Turichenko came to grips with a theatre artist’s career.  On May 7, 8, 2002 at the Odessa Music Comedy theatre a premiere of the rock-opera "Romeo and Juliet" took place, where Turichenko has played a leading part. The "Romeo and Juliet" is in the repertoire of the Odessa academical Music Comedy theatre and now. It had been played over 300 times. Turichenko became laureate of the International Competition of Actors of Operetta and Musical.

In January 2004, Turichenko became laureate of the Man of the Year award in nomination The opening of the year. The award for the best representatives in the opinion collected from citizens of Odessa was presented at Odessa Opera and Ballet Theatre. From August 2004, Turichenko played a leading part in a performance “The Canterville Ghost”, based on the Oscar Wilde's book.

In November 2009 took place a premiere of youth musical Siliconovaya dura.net on the stage of the Odessa academical Music Comedy theatre. One of the major parts also plays Turichenko.

The turning point in Turichenko's career began in 2005. Then, among of several thousand applicants, he has received a part in the Moscow performance, namely in Andrew Lloyd Webber`s  musical "Cats". He has also perfectly recommended himself at the following qualifying contests: Pop Idol, New wave and 5 stars. The jury of one of the contests included well-known musical and theatrical producer Katerina von Gechmen-Valdek, who saw a huge who saw a huge creative potential in the upcoming artist, introduced him to Michael Topalov (producer of a popular vocal ex-duet Smash!!). In late 2005 Sergey Lazarev left and M. Topalov offered Turichenko to join the band. At the same time, the qualifying contest You're a Star, which can give a chance to participate in Eurovision Song Contest 2006, started in Ukraine. The singer has decided to try his skills there. As a result Turichenko was one of the top twelve finalists, selected among thousand applicants from all country. The Artist had to make a choice what to prefer – to work in already over-hyped Russian project or to risk and try luck in representing Ukraine at the international song contest and to conquer Europe. The last seemed to Turichenko more attractive. He moved to Kyiv and he appeared in the TV project final round, where he took an honourable second place.

After the TV contest Kyiv producers got interested in Turichenko so he started his solo career. His songs were on the top list of radio charts at the leading radio stations of Ukraine. His first music videos were his on musical TV channels of the country. He performed at some musical festivals of Ukraine, Russia and Belarus.

In May 2010, the single "4 Seasons of Love", written by Turichenko with Ray Horton, the ex-member of The Real Milli Vanilli, was presented in Ukraine. The Russian clip-maker Pavel Khudyakov and operator Maxim Osadchy shot a summer music video "4 Seasons of Love".

The singer prepared solo album, recorded at major studios in Russia and Ukraine. Mastering of the album took place in February 2011 in London Metropolis studio, which at one time Lady Gaga, Justin Timberlake, Michael Jackson and other world stars recorded their songs.

In November 2010, in Crystal Hall in Kyiv Turichenko presented his new music video "Prosti menya" /Forgive me/, directed by Katya Tsarik. The singer presented also his new concert show, which included 12 songs from the new album.

In February 2011, Turichenko signed with leading recording company in Ukraine, MOON records, to release his debut album, "". In just one year Turichenko fully updated his stage concert show.

Turichenko's album "Peresechenie sudeb" includes 13 songs, some of which have become successfully all-Ukrainian hits.

In August 2011, Turichenko was appreciated by music experts of show business "Crystal Microphone" award. Turichenko's album "Peresechenie sudeb" was recognized as the best in the category  "Album of the Year" , and Turichenko himself as the "Idol of the year."

In 2011 he took part also in a reality television show "Survivor", becoming a finalist in the last episode of the project.

In early 2012 Turichenko became a participant of the main Ukrainian vocal show "The Voice" on 1+1 TV channel.

Theater works

The theater came to Turichenko's life in his early years. When he was 13 years old his parents sent him to study at Odessa high school № 37 drama class under the direction of Olga Kashneva. 
Famous stars of movie and theater such as Nonna Grishaeva, Irina Apeksimova and many other studied here.

After studying at the drama school Turichenko came to grips with a theater artist’s career.

At this moment in the repertoire of actor there are three leading parts in sensational performances. Moreover he is laureate of one theatrical award (in 2004 he became laureate of the International Competition of Actors of Operetta and Musical).

Rock-opera Romeo and Juliet

The premiere took place on May 7, 2002, on the stage of the Odessa academical Music Comedy theatre named after M.Vodyanoy. A leading part (Romeo) was played by Turichenko and he continues to play it.

The stage director of the performance Georgiy Kovtun made the serious demands to all actors. So, they should not only sing, play and dance perfectly, but also execute difficult acrobatic tricks. All of these elements were dictated by scenography: two board constructions moved by the stage, transforming in imagination of spectators to locks of Montague and Capulet, to fighting vehicles, to serf towers.

The textures of suits of heroes well-matched to all atmosphere of performance: "skin-bast mat-zamsh-metal". The stage director of performance, the choreographer, the honoured worker of arts of Russia, the winner of the international contests considered that the majority of performances, based on the Shakespeare's works are very refined and coddled, that is why he wanted to show a power and pressure, epoch – barbarous. And it has given an original colouring. Young sincerely enamoured Romeo and Juliet are especially fragile, defenceless and pure against a huge and blind power on the background.

This rock opera is being sold out for every performance for many years.

The Canterville ghost

In January 2004, Turichenko became a laureate of the Man of the Year award in nomination The opening of the year. And in August on the stage of the Odessa academical Music Comedy theatre named after M.Vodyanoy took place “The Canterville Ghost” premiere, based on the same named Oscar Wilde's book. Turichenko acts a leading role again – the ghost sir Simon.

The musical was produced by the Honoured worker of Arts of Russia Georgiy Kovtun. Turichenko plays a three hundred-years-old ghost.

Siliconovaya dura.ne

The musical Siliconovaya dura.net is a modern tragicomedy about life of senior pupils. Along with an appreciation of experts, this performance has caused the rough discussions and disputes that the theatre did not know yet.

Turichenko’s hero Mitya became a victim of the Internet.

Discography

Peresechenie sudeb (2011)

 Track list

Music videos
 2010 : 4 Seasons of Love (in duet with Ray Horton)
 2010 : Prosti mrenya

References

External links
 Official site (available in Russian, English)
 YouTube channel
 
 Facebook official community()
 Facebook official community

1983 births
21st-century Ukrainian male actors
Ukrainian musicians
Living people
Ukrainian male musical theatre actors
K. D. Ushinsky South Ukrainian National Pedagogical University alumni